Canning Highway is an arterial road in Perth, Western Australia, linking the inner Perth suburb of Victoria Park in the north-east, to the port city of Fremantle in the south-west.

It is located immediately south of the Swan River and runs between The Causeway in Victoria Park and Queen Victoria Street in Fremantle.

The Canning Highway was the inspiration for the AC/DC song "Highway to Hell" as it had a reputation for accidents and led to many of singer Bon Scott's favourite pubs and hotels, including the Raffles Hotel.

History
Canning Highway is named after the river which it crosses, which was in turn named after George Canning (1770–1827), an eminent British statesman who for a brief period was Prime Minister of Great Britain.

The modern highway was formally commenced in the 1920s, with major work commencing in 1927 to upgrade an  section between Suburban Street, South Perth (now Mill Point Road) and Petra Street, East Fremantle. The road initially had the following names:

 Canning Road (Fremantle–Wireless Hill)
 Perth–Fremantle Road (Wireless Hill–Canning Bridge)
 Lower Canning Road (Canning Bridge–South Terrace)
 Fremantle Road (South Terrace–Causeway)

The road was officially named Canning Highway on 23 November 1937. In 1938, the present northern bridge over Canning River was opened. The experience gained building this bridge was used to construct the Fremantle Traffic Bridge over the Swan River one year later. The Fremantle Traffic Bridge joined Canning Highway near Fremantle with North Fremantle, and this intersection forms the highway's present western terminus.

In 1958, the present southern bridge over Canning River was constructed which coincided with the opening of Kwinana Freeway between the Narrows Bridge and Canning Highway.

In 1974, the rotary (roundabout) at the southern end of the Causeway in Victoria Park was upgraded to a parclo interchange, which resulted in Canning Highway joining seamlessly with Great Eastern Highway. At the same time, Stirling Highway was extended from North Fremantle across the Swan River via the new Stirling bridge to join with Canning Highway.

In 1979, a new diamond interchange was built near Canning Bridge to route the Kwinana Freeway underneath Canning Highway and progress the freeway further southwards.

Apart from minor additional lanes and modifications, the highway has remained largely unchanged since.

Raffles Hotel

One of the most enduring sights on Canning Highway has been the Raffles Hotel at night-time, with its ornamental lighting and an iconic animated rooftop neon beer sign (for many years advertising Swan Lager). It is situated in Applecross adjacent to Canning Bridge. The hotel has reopened with a pub and a bottle shop called Raffles Liquor Merchants. The Raffles later swapped to two beer advertising neon lights, one for Victoria bitter and one large one advertising Crown lager. Since at least 2015 however, the neon lights now advertise Asahi Super Dry.

Public transport
Canning Highway crosses the Kwinana Freeway at the Canning Bridge station on the Mandurah railway line. Buses also stop at this station and enter and exit the freeway via bus lanes. High frequency route 910 traverses the whole length of Canning Highway, and route 111 also runs along the section of the highway west of Canning Bridge. Special event route 659 runs a limited stop route along Canning Highway between Fremantle Station and Perth Stadium.

Major intersections & interchanges
The entire highway is located in the Perth Metropolitan Region. All intersections mentioned below are signalised unless otherwise mentioned.

See also

 Highways in Australia
 List of highways in Western Australia
 List of major roads in Perth, Western Australia

References

External links

 Main Roads Western Australia official website

Highways and freeways in Perth, Western Australia
Highway 1 (Australia)